Gascoyne is an administrative region in Western Australia.

Gascoyne may also refer to:

Places

Western Australia
 Gascoyne bioregion
 Gascoyne Junction, Western Australia
 Gascoyne River
 Electoral district of Gascoyne
 Electoral district of Gascoyne (Legislative Council)
 Shire of Upper Gascoyne

Elsewhere
 Gascoyne, North Dakota

Other uses
 Gascoyne (surname)
 , two ships

See also
 Gascoyne coast (disambiguation)
 Gascoyne-Cecil, a surname
 
 Gascoigne, a surname
 Gascon (disambiguation)
 Gascony (disambiguation)